William Jardine Herries Maxwell (4 March 1852 – 31 July 1933) was a Liberal Unionist politician in Scotland.

Maxwell was the son of Wellwood Herries Maxwell of Munches in Buittle and his wife Jane Home Jardine.

Maxwell was elected at the 1892 general election as the member of parliament (MP) for Dumfriesshire, but lost it very narrowly in 1895, when his Liberal Party opponent had a majority of only 13 votes. He regained his seat in 1900, but stood down at the 1906 general election.

References

External links 

1852 births
1933 deaths
Liberal Unionist Party MPs for Scottish constituencies
UK MPs 1892–1895
UK MPs 1900–1906